Lists of phrases